Beinn Bharrain (721 m) is a mountain on the Isle of Arran, Scotland, located in the far northwest of the Island.

Despite being less frequently visited than its eastern neighbours, it still provides fine views from the top. The entire hill is known as Beinn Bharrain, with 'Mullach Buidhe' the highest of its summits.

References

Mountains and hills of the Isle of Arran
Marilyns of Scotland
Grahams